Tallinn University (TLU; , TLÜ) is a public research university in Estonia. Located in the centre of Tallinn, the capital city of Estonia, Tallinn University is one of the three largest institutions of higher education in the country. Both QS World University and Times Higher Education rankings place it among the top 1000 universities in the world.

History
Tallinn University's predecessor, Tallinn Teachers' Seminar, was founded in 1919. Tallinn University in its present form was established on 18 March 2005 as the result of a merger of several universities and research institutions in Tallinn:  Academic Library of Estonia (1946), Baltic Film and Media School (1992/97), Estonian Institute of Humanities (1988), Institute of History (1946) and Tallinn Pedagogical University (1919/52/92). In 2015, Tallinn University underwent a structural reform, whereby its 20+ structural units (the legacy of the numerous mergers leading to its establishment) were reorganized into six schools in order to optimize funding and eliminate overlap between units in research and teaching.

Academics

As of 2019, about 7,000 degree students were enrolled at Tallinn University (with over 13,000 more taking part in continuing education programmes). This makes Tallinn University the third largest provider of higher education in Estonia. Among degree students, 11% were international. There are 968 employees at the university, of which 502 are academic staff. 13% of the faculty are international.

Education and research at Tallinn University focus on five core interdisciplinary fields: educational innovation, digital and media culture, cultural competences, healthy and sustainable lifestyle and society and open governance. Each of the fields is represented by a school of the university: School of Educational Sciences, Baltic Film, Media, Arts and Communication School; School of Humanities, School of Natural Sciences and Health, and School of Governance, Law and Society. The School of Digital Technologies is the sixth school, contributing to all of the fields.

Tallinn University's Baltic Film, Media, Arts and Communication School is the only institution in Northern Europe teaching film, television and audiovisual production in English, and one of the largest film schools in the region. Its student body represents over 40 countries worldwide.

Tallinn University actively participates in international research projects. Quacquarelli Symonds classifies its research output as "Very High", while in the 2021 edition of the Times Higher Education World Rankings, its research coefficient is the fourth highest in the Baltic States.

Tallinn University was ranked among the top 1000 universities in the world (in the 801-1000 bracket) in the 2019, 2020 and 2021 editions of QS World University Rankings, as well as the Times Higher Education World University Ranking for 2020 and 2021. In 2020, Tallinn University placed 71st in the EECA (Emerging Europe and Central Asia) rankings published by Quacquarelli Symonds, up from 87th in the 2016 edition. In QS World University Rankings by Subject, Tallinn University placed in the 201-250 bracket in Sociology, making it the best university in the Baltic States in the discipline. In THE Subject Ranking 2021 Tallinn University placed in the 301-400 bracket in Education, 401-500 bracket in Social Sciences and 401-500 bracket in Arts & Humanities

Campus

Tallinn University's main campus buildings have Latin names.

Terra (Latin: earth) is the main and oldest building on Tallinn University's campus. It was built for the Tallinn English College in 1938. The building is under heritage protection. It was designed by architects Alar Kotli and Erika Nõva.

Nova (Latin: new) houses the Baltic Film and Media School. Features include individual and group workrooms, lecture halls, a film studio, a television studio, sound studios, a cinema, a computer class, and editing rooms. The building was completed in 2012, and was designed by architects Karli Luik, Maarja Kask, and Ralf Lõoke.

Mare (Latin: sea) was designed to optimise the amount of light penetrating into the building. The building was completed in 2006; the architects were Mattias Agabus, Eero Endjärv, Raul Järg, Priit Pent, and Illimar Truverk.

Astra (Latin: star) is the university's newest building. This building houses laboratories. The building was designed by Ignar Fjuk and completed in 2012.

Silva (Latin: forest) was completed in 1982 and is a typical example of Soviet architecture. It was designed by the architect Ester Liiberg.

Vita (Latin: life) was built in 2020 and presently houses the BFM, School of Natural Sciences and Health, and the university's sports teams. The building was designed by Maarja Kask, Ralf Lõokene, Kaisa Simon, and Pelle-Sten Viiburg.

Internationalisation
Internationalisation is positioned as one of Tallinn University's goals, affecting its development strategies and priorities. The university offers a range of English-language academic programmes at all levels of study, as well as short courses aimed at international students. As of 2021, Tallinn University ranked third in the Baltic states by the percentage of international students, behind Tallinn University of Technology and slightly ahead of the University of Tartu. With international faculty comprising 13% of the total faculty, it was also ranked among the top 15 institutions in the Emerging Europe and Central Asia by the percentage of international faculty.

Tallinn University currently maintains over 40 inter-university agreements with universities in Europe, U.S., Japan, China, Russia, and several other countries as well over 400 Erasmus exchange agreements with universities from all over the European Union. The university also organises Summer and Winter Schools, which host about 300 participants from 50 countries every year.

Structure

Schools
 Baltic Film, Media and Arts School
 School of Digital Technologies
 School of Educational Sciences
 School of Governance, Law and Society
 School of Humanities
 School of Natural Sciences and Health

Colleges
 Haapsalu College

Academic Unit Centres 
 BFM Production Centre
 Centre for Educational Technology
 Centre for Innovation in Education
 Centre for Landscape and Culture
 Centre of Excellence in Health Promotion and Rehabilitation
 Estonian Institute for Population Studies
 Institute for International Social Studies
 Institute of Ecology
 Institute of History, Archaeology and Art History

Centres of Excellence 
 TU Centre of Excellence in Behavioural and Neural Sciences
 TU Centre of Excellence in Educational Innovation
 TU Centre of Excellence in Intercultural Studies
 TU Centre of Excellence in Interdisciplinary Lifecourse Studies
 TU Centre of Excellence in Media Innovation and Digital Culture

Sports and culture 
Tallinn University has a range of cultural and sport activities. The university has a symphony orchestra, men's choir, women's choir, and the folk dance group Soveldaja.

Other
Tallinn University of Technology Library

Notable faculty 
 Paul E. Beaudoin, American composer and music theorist
 Peeter Järvelaid, legal scholar and former advisor to the Estonian Ministry of Justice
 Richard Lomax, educational psychologist (currently professor of education at Ohio State University)
 Mihhail Lotman, semiotician and politician
 Andres Luure, philosopher and translator
 Katrin Niglas(et)
 Hannes Palang(et)
 Michel Poulain, demographer, known for the concept of Blue Zone
 Tõnis Rätsep, lecturer, actor, musician and academic
 Rein Raud, professor of Cultural Theory and Japanese studies, writer and translator
 Pia Tikka, filmmaker and academic

References

External links

  

 
Universities and colleges in Estonia
Educational institutions established in 1919
Educational institutions established in 2005
Education in Tallinn
1919 establishments in Estonia
2005 establishments in Estonia
Universities and colleges formed by merger in Estonia